The 1983–84 Nationale A season was the 63rd season of the Nationale A, the top level of ice hockey in France. 12 teams participated in the league, and Club des Sports de Megève won their first league title. Image Club d'Epinal was voluntarily relegated to the Nationale B due to financial issues.

First round

Final round

Relegation

Hockey Club de Caen would have been relegated but remained in the Nationale A for the following season as Image Club d'Epinal voluntarily went down to the Nationale B.

External links
 Season on hockeyarchives.info

Fra
1983–84 in French ice hockey
Ligue Magnus seasons